The qualifying rounds for the 2007–08 UEFA Champions League began on 17 July 2007. In total, there were three qualifying rounds which provided 16 clubs to join the group stage.

Teams

First qualifying round
The draw was held on 29 June 2007 in Nyon, Switzerland. The draw was conducted by UEFA General Secretary David Taylor and Michele Centenaro, UEFA's head of club competitions.

Seeding

Summary
The first leg matches were held on 17 July and 18 July, while the second legs were played on 24 July and 25 July 2007.

|}

Matches

Dinamo Zagreb won 4–2 on aggregate.

BATE won 3–2 on aggregate.

Sheriff Tiraspol won 5–0 on aggregate.

FH won 4–1 on aggregate.

4–4 on aggregate; Ventspils won on away goals.

Levadia won 1–0 on aggregate.

Astana won 3–0 on aggregate.

Zeta won 5–4 on aggregate.

Tampere United won 4–1 on aggregate.

Žilina won 7–5 on aggregate.

Elfsborg won 1–0 on aggregate.

Pyunik won 2–0 on aggregate.

Sarajevo won 9–1 on aggregate.

Domžale won 3–1 on aggregate.

Second qualifying round
The draw was held on 29 June 2007 in Nyon, Switzerland. The draw was conducted by UEFA General Secretary David Taylor and Michele Centenaro, UEFA's head of club competitions.

Seeding

Notes

Summary
The first leg matches were played on 31 July and 1 August, while the second legs were played on 7 August and 8 August 2007.

|}

Matches

Shakhtar Donetsk won 4–1 on aggregate.

2–2 on aggregate; Red Star Belgrade won on away goals.

Rangers won 3–0 on aggregate.

Elfsborg won 1–0 on aggregate.

Steaua won 3–1 on aggregate.

2–2 on aggregate; Sarajevo won on away goals.

Red Bull Salzburg won 7–0 on aggregate.

Rosenborg won 10–2 on aggregate.

BATE won 4–2 on aggregate.

Copenhagen won 2–1 on aggregate.

0–0 on aggregate; Slavia Prague won on penalties.

Tampere United won 2–0 on aggregate.

Dinamo Zagreb won 5–2 on aggregate.

Beşiktaş won 4–0 on aggregate.

Third qualifying round
The draw was held on 3 August 2007 in Nyon, Switzerland. The draw was conducted by UEFA General Secretary David Taylor and Giorgio Marchetti, UEFA's director of professional football.

Seeding

Notes

Summary
The first leg matches were played on 14 August and 15 August, while the second legs were played on 28 August and 29 August 2007. Winners in this round qualified for the group stage, while the losing clubs entered the first round of the UEFA Cup. Due to the death of Antonio Puerta, the second leg of Sevilla's game against AEK Athens was postponed until 3 September.

|}

Matches

Steaua București won 4–2 on aggregate.

Rosenborg won 5–0 on aggregate.

2–2 on aggregate; Celtic won on penalties.

Werder Bremen won 5–3 on aggregate.

Shakhtar Donetsk won 3–2 on aggregate.

Slavia Prague won 3–1 on aggregate.

Valencia won 5–1 on aggregate.

Dynamo Kyiv won 4–0 on aggregate.

Fenerbahçe won 3–0 on aggregate.

Rangers won 1–0 on aggregate.

Liverpool won 5–0 on aggregate.

Benfica won 3–1 on aggregate.

Lazio won 4–2 on aggregate.

Arsenal won 5–0 on aggregate.

Beşiktaş won 3–1 on aggregate.

Sevilla won 6–1 on aggregate.

Notes

References

External links
UEFA Competitions Results 2007/08

Qualifying Rounds
2007-08